No Podemos Volar (We Can't Fly) (2000) is the seventeenth studio album by Mexican band El Tri. Is the first one to include Duets, containing 4 of them with recognized singers of Mexican music.

Track listing 
All tracks by Alex Lora except where noted.

 "No Podemos Volar" (We Can't Fly) – 6:34
 "Madre Tierra" (Mother Earth) – 3:45
 "Ya No Existen los Héroes" (Heroes No Longer Exist) – 4:02
 "Amor del Dos de Octubre" (Love of October 2nd (Carlos Carbajal, Lora) – 5:04
 "Nosotros los Latinos" (We The Latins) – 5:33
 "Prueba de Amor" (Proof of Love) (Lora, Chela Lora) – 3:36
 "Todos Necesitamos de Todos" (Everybody Needs Everybody) – 4:25
 "Cuando Estoy Con Mis Cuates" (When I Am With My Pals) – 3:01
 "Chilango Exiliado" (Exiled Chilango) – 3:56
 "En el Último Trago" (In The Last Drink) (José Alfredo Jiménez) – 4:40
 "Aca Tambien Se Cuecen Habas" (We Cook Beans Over Here Too) (Lora, Oscar Zarate) – 4:11
 "Todo Por Servir Se Acaba" (Everything Breaks Down For Use) – 3:41

Personnel 
 Alex Lora – guitar, bass, vocals, producer, mixing
 Rafael Salgado – harmonic
 Eduardo Chico – guitar, dobro
 Oscar Zarate – guitar
 Chela Lora – backing vocals, planning, coordination
 Ramon Perez – drums

Guest musicians 
 Miguel Rios – vocals in "Madre Tierra"
 Lalo Gameros – violin, vocals in "Cuando Estoy Con Mis Cuates"
 Jorge Navarro – guitar in "Cuando Estoy Con Mis Cuates"
 Alberto "El Cuervo" Angel – vocals in "En el Ultimo Trago"
 Andres Gimenez – vocals in "Todos Necesitamos de Todos"
 Lalo Toral – piano
 Paulinho Da Costa – percussion in "Amor Del 2 de Octube" and "Nosotros Los Latinos"

Technical 
Fernando Aceves – photography
Mark Chalecki – mastering
Andrea E Estrada – photography
Juan Carlos Frank – make-up
Jim Gaines – producer
Pablo Munguia – assistant
Jorge Navarro – guitar
Ramon Perez – drums
Sergio Rivero – photography
Eddie Sakaki – photography
Jean B. Smit – engineer, mastering, recorder

External links 
www.eltri.com.mx
No Podemos Volar at MusicBrainz
[ No Podemos Volar] at AllMusic

El Tri albums
2000 albums
Warner Music Group albums